Maurice Zbriger (July 10, 1896, Kamenets-Podolskiy, Ukraine – April 5, 1981, Montreal, Quebec, Canada) was a Canadian violinist, composer and conductor. He began learning violin as a child, and continued his studies at the conservatory in St. Petersburg, Russia, where he was a classmate of Jascha Heifetz, Nathan Milstein and Mischa Elman.

He left Russia in 1920 and traveled throughout Europe, until he arrived in Montreal in 1924. He quickly found work there at His Majesty's Theatre, in silent film houses, and other venues. He was one of the founders of the Traymore Quartet in 1925, which later became the Traymore Salon Orchestra. He was one of the first Canadians to specialize in Roma music and performed and conducted for a radio show that ran on the station CKAC for 40 years.

Zbriger became a partner in, and eventually the sole owner of, the Montreal Hebrew Delicatessen. Better known as "Schwartz's", this restaurant is famous for its distinctive Montreal-style smoked meat. With the profits from this business, Zbriger spent many thousands of dollars organizing free concerts of his music.

Zbriger was unable to pursue a career as a concert violinist because his wife was in poor health. Mrs. Zbriger was a pianist and co-composed music with Maurice, until her death after 65 years of marriage.

Many of Zbriger's compositions were dedicated to famous people. He wrote The Vincent Massey March (1952) for the Canadian statesman of the same name, while "Mother's Lullaby" (1948) was dedicated to Charles, Prince of Wales upon his birth. The individuals honored by Zbriger frequently received copies of the music with letters he commissioned.

In his later years, arthritis in his hands prevented Zbriger from performing publicly, though he continued to compose and conduct until his death.

Sources 

 Ianzelo, T. (Director), Courtois, D. & Symansky, A. (Producers). (1993). The Concert Man. [Motion picture]. Ottawa: National Film Board of Canada

External links
Watch The Concert Man at NFB.ca

1896 births
1981 deaths
Businesspeople from Montreal
Canadian classical composers
Canadian classical violinists
Male classical violinists
Male conductors (music)
Canadian people of Ukrainian-Jewish descent
Canadian restaurateurs
Jews from the Russian Empire
Jewish Canadian musicians
Jewish classical composers
Musicians from Montreal
Russian emigrants to Canada
Ukrainian Jews
20th-century Canadian conductors (music)
20th-century classical composers
Canadian male classical composers
20th-century classical violinists
20th-century Canadian composers
20th-century Canadian male musicians
20th-century Canadian violinists and fiddlers
Canadian male violinists and fiddlers